Deportivo Junín is a Peruvian football club, playing in the city of Huancayo, Junín, Peru.

The club is the biggest of Huancayo city.

The club play in the Copa Perú which is the third division of the Peruvian league.

History
In the 1972 Copa Perú, the club classified to the Final Stage, but remained in the third-place.

The club have played at the highest level of Peruvian football on seventeen occasions, from 1974 Torneo Descentralizado until 1990 Torneo Descentralizado when was relegated to the Copa Perú.

Honours

Regional
Liga Distrital de Huancayo: 1
Winners (1): 1971
Runner-up (3): 1968, 1969, 1970

See also
List of football clubs in Peru
Peruvian football league system

References

External links
Los naranjas del Deportivo Junín
Perú 1987
Perú 1988
Perú 1990

Football clubs in Peru